Wife for a Day (Swedish: Hustru för en dag) is a 1933 Swedish comedy film directed by Gösta Rodin and starring Aina Rosén, Erik Berglund and Tollie Zellman. It was shot at studios in the Segeltorp suburb of Stockholm.

Synopsis
In order to secure an inheritance from his aunt, a man needs to find a woman to pretend to be his wife for a day.

Cast
 Aina Rosén as 	Ingrid
 Greta Tegnér as 	Karin 
 Erik Berglund as 	Svensson
 Tollie Zellman as 	Aunt Eufemia Wall
 Nils Ohlin as Richard Wall
 Rune Carlsten as 	Brylander
 Olle Hilding as Benjamin
 Ruth Stevens as Divorcée
 Åke Uppström as 	Knutte

References

Bibliography 
 Larsson, Mariah & Marklund, Anders. Swedish Film: An Introduction and Reader. Nordic Academic Press, 2010.
 Wright, Rochelle. The Visible Wall: Jews and Other Ethnic Outsiders in Swedish Film. SIU Press, 1998.

External links 
 

1933 films
1933 comedy films
Swedish comedy films
1930s Swedish-language films
Swedish black-and-white films
Films directed by Gösta Rodin
1930s Swedish films